Live in Taipei is a double live album by John Zorn's Masada recorded at the Crown Theatre in Taiwan's capital city Taipei. The album is mistakenly dated 1995, while the performance was actually taken place in 1996.

Reception
The Allmusic review by Joclyn Layne awarded the album 3½ stars stating "With so many exceptional recordings available of the Masada quartet, this one may be considered less necessary, but it's still necessary for most fans ".

Track listing 
 Disc one
 "Gevurah" – 12:38
 "Achshaph" – 2:41
 "Mahshav" – 7:09
 "Shebuah" – 12:06
 "Shilhim" – 2:45
 "Idalah-Abal" – 8:24
 "Mikreh" – 10:45
 "Yoreh" – 7:42 
 "Tekufah" – 9:16
 Disc two
 "Debir" – 9:17
 "Sheloshim" – 8:11
 "Katzatz" – 2:47
 "Hadasha" – 11:21 
 "Lachish" – 2:25
 "Midbar" – 9:08
 "Evel" – 5:45
 "Hafla-ah" – 6:34
 "Racheb" – 7:08
 "Ziphim" – 10:20

Personnel 
 John Zorn – saxophone
 Dave Douglas – trumpet
 Greg Cohen – bass
 Joey Baron – drums

References 

Masada (band) albums
Albums produced by John Zorn
John Zorn live albums
1998 live albums
Tzadik Records live albums